Haris Škoro (born September 2, 1962) is a Bosnian former footballer who represented Yugoslavia at international level.

Club career
He started playing football at hometown club FK Vogošća. After that, this still talented youngster, left to NK Bosna Visoko for which he played for one season. He was spotted there by FK Željezničar Sarajevo scouts who wanted him to come and play for them. In 1982, he made his debut in FK Željezničar's blue shirt. This powerful striker played a little more than 100 games for the club. He was a part of the great generation which have managed to reach the 1984-1985 UEFA Cup semifinals.

That same year, he made his debut for Yugoslav national team as well. He has collected 15 caps in following years. He also scored four goals and played in the 1990 FIFA World Cup qualifiers for Yugoslavia.

In 1987, he moved to Dinamo Zagreb as Miroslav Blažević's biggest wish at the time. He made 30 appearances in the league and scored 14 goals. After only one season in Dinamo, he went to Serie A club Torino. He stayed there for three seasons and played alongside Torino stars like Rafael Martín Vázquez, Luis Müller and Francesco Romano.

He moved to Switzerland in 1992. as he has signed a contract with FC Zürich. He played for this Swiss club until 1995. After that, he played for FC Baden before he finally ended his career in 1996.

International career
Škoro made his debut for Yugoslavia in a September 1985 World Cup qualification match against East Germany in which he scored his country's only goals and has earned a total of 15 caps, scoring 4 goals. He scored against England in a friendly at Wembley on December 13, 1989, a game which would see England win 2-1 and was his final international.

Škoro did not feature in an official game for the Bosnian national team as it did not play any before 1996.

International goals 
''Scores and results table. Yugoslavia's goal tally first:

Personal life 
He lives in Switzerland.

References

External links

Profile - Reprezentacija

1962 births
Living people
People from Vogošća
Association football forwards
Yugoslav footballers
Yugoslavia international footballers
Bosnia and Herzegovina footballers
NK Bosna Visoko players
FK Željezničar Sarajevo players
GNK Dinamo Zagreb players
Torino F.C. players
FC Zürich players
FC Baden players
Yugoslav First League players
Serie A players
Serie B players
Swiss Super League players
Yugoslav expatriate footballers
Expatriate footballers in Italy
Yugoslav expatriate sportspeople in Italy
Bosnia and Herzegovina expatriate footballers
Expatriate footballers in Switzerland
Yugoslav expatriate sportspeople in Switzerland
Bosnia and Herzegovina expatriate sportspeople in Switzerland